The Floating Opera is a novel by American writer John Barth, first published in 1956 and significantly revised in 1967.  Barth's first published work, the existentialist and nihilist story is a first-person account of a day when protagonist Todd Andrews contemplates suicide.

Critics and Barth himself often pair The Floating Opera with Barth's next novel, The End of the Road (1958); both were written in 1955, and they are available together in a one-volume edition.  Both are philosophical novels; The End of the Road continues with the conclusions made about absolute values by the protagonist of The Floating Opera, and takes these ideas "to the end of the road".  Barth wrote both novels in a realistic mode, in contrast to Barth's better-known metafictional, fabulist, and postmodern works from the 1960s and later, such as Lost in the Funhouse (1968) and LETTERS (1979).

Publication history

While teaching at Penn State, Barth embarked on a cycle of 100 stories he called Dorchester Tales; he abandoned it halfway through to begin his first two published novels.  He completed both The Floating Opera and The End of the Road in 1955.  After a string of publisher rejections, Appleton-Century-Crofts agreed to published The Floating Opera in 1956, but stipulated it "conclude on a less 'nihilist' note"; Barth complied and altered the ending.  Sales were not strong enough to encourage the publisher to pick up Barth's next offering, which was felt to be too similar to the first book. The End of the Road was published by Doubleday in 1958; it received only marginally more attention than The Floating Opera.  Barth made a number of changes to the text for a revised edition from Anchor Books in 1967, including restoration of the original ending.  Anchor collected Barth's first two novels in a single-volume edition in 1988.

Background

The Floating Opera can be viewed with The End of the Road (1958) as forming the early, existentialist or nihilist phase of Barth's writing career.  This phase was realistic in a modernist sense; it lacked the fantastic elements that manifested themselves in Barth's experimental phase that began with The Sot-Weed Factor (1960).  Both novels, while displaying a distinctive style, followed conventions readers expected from a novel, and were part of the realist trend in novels prevalent in the United States during the 1940s and 1950s.  As The Floating Opera closes, its protagonist, Todd Andrews, concludes that life has no absolute values but that there are relative values that are "no less 'real,' for ... being relative".  Barth has said he wrote The End of the Road to refute this worldview by carrying "all non-mystical value-thinking to the end of the road", and that the second novel was a "nihilistic tragedy" paired with the "nihilistic comedy" of the first.  Barth also sees the book as the second of a "loose trilogy of novels" that concludes with The Sot-Weed Factor, after which he embarked on the fabulist Giles Goat-Boy (1966).

Reception and legacy

New York Times reviewer Orville Prescott called the "odd" book dull, labored, and flat; he found the humor funny, but the solemn philosophizing was at odds with the farcical action of the narrative.  He called into question the believability of Barth's protagonist: "It is impossible to believe that anyone who took such relish in his own sense of humor, in Maryland rye and in lovemaking would consider suicide for a moment."

As The Floating Opera and The End of the Road make little display of the metafictional formal prowess of Barth's later works, critics often overlook them.  Some consider these first two novels little more than apprentice works, while others see them in light of the later works, removed from their historical and social context.

References

Works cited

Primary sources

Secondary sources

Further reading

External links
 

1956 American novels
Novels by John Barth
Novels set in Maryland
Appleton-Century-Crofts books
1956 debut novels
Anchor Books books